Northwest of Earth is a 1954 collection of science fiction and fantasy short stories by C. L. Moore.  It was first published by Gnome Press in 1954 in an edition of 4,000 copies.  The collections contains stories about Moore's characters Northwest Smith and Jirel of Joiry.  The stories all originally appeared in the magazine Weird Tales.

Contents
 "The Cold Gray God"
 "The Dark Land"
 "Dust of Gods"
 "Hellsgarde"
 "Julhi"
 "Lost Paradise"
 "Yvala"

Reception
P. Schuyler Miller praised the collection as "full of the lush, colorful tapestry of words which Merritt did best of all, and which we lack in most modern science fiction." J. Francis McComas reviewed it favorably in The New York Times, but noted that it represented Moore's "youthful" work.

References

Sources

1954 short story collections
Science fiction short story collections
Fantasy short story collections
Works originally published in Weird Tales
Gnome Press books